Chase Andrew Budinger (born May 22, 1988) is an American professional volleyball player and former professional basketball player. He was selected by the Detroit Pistons with the 44th overall pick in 2009 NBA draft after playing three years of college basketball for the University of Arizona.

High school career
Budinger was a standout basketball and volleyball player at La Costa Canyon High School while living in Encinitas, California; his teammates on the basketball team included future NFL quarterback Kevin O'Connell.  In basketball, he led La Costa Canyon to the CIF San Diego Section title in 2006. In volleyball, he led his school to three state championships and was named by Volleyball Magazine as the National Player of the Year as a senior.

Budinger was a McDonald's All-American and was the runner-up in the 2006 McDonald's All-American Slam Dunk Contest.

Considered a five-star recruit by Rivals.com, Budinger was listed as the No. 2 small forward and the No. 4 player in the nation in 2006.

College career
Budinger chose to concentrate on basketball, signing with Arizona—a school that did not (and still does not) sponsor varsity men's volleyball—although he received offers from many other schools, most notably offers by USC and UCLA to play both basketball and volleyball. He averaged 15.6 points in his freshman season, starting all 30 games for the Wildcats.  At the conclusion of the season he announced that he planned to stay with Arizona for his sophomore season, despite speculation that he could be picked early in the NBA draft. However, he later announced that he would declare for the draft and not hire an agent. He was projected as a mid-first-round pick by most draft analysts. However, on the final day of the deadline for pulling out of the early entry list, Budinger opted not to remain in the draft and returned to school instead.

After the 2008–09 season, he declared for the NBA draft a second time. Under an NCAA rule back then, declaring for the draft a second time ended a player's college eligibility. In 2016, that rule was revised to allow a player to enter and withdraw from the draft multiple times without losing eligibility.

College statistics

|-
| align="left" | 2006–07
| align="left" | Arizona
| 31 || 31 || 33.0 || .485 || .368 || .845 || 5.8 || 2.0 || 1.2 || 0.4 || 15.6
|-
| align="left" | 2007–08
| align="left" | Arizona
| 34 || 34 || 35.3 || .446 || .380 || .718 || 5.4 || 2.9 || 1.1 || 0.2 || 17.1
|-
| align="left" | 2008–09
| align="left" | Arizona
| 35 || 35 || 37.6 || .480 || .399 || .801 || 6.2 || 3.4 || 1.4 || 0.5 || 18.0
|- class="sortbottom"
| style="text-align:center;" colspan="2" |Career
| 100 || 100 || 35.4 || .469 || .383 || .782 || 5.8 || 2.8 || 1.3 || 0.4 || 17.0
|-

Professional career

Houston Rockets (2009–2012)
In 2009, he was drafted by the Detroit Pistons, and then traded to the Houston Rockets on draft night. He joined the Rockets' Summer League team, and averaged 17.8 PPG. In the 2009 season opener for the Rockets, Budinger came off the bench and logged 15 minutes of playing time while scoring 6 points and collecting one rebound. On March 30, 2010, Budinger scored 24 points in a 98–94 home win against the Washington Wizards. Three days later he matched this total in a 119–114 road win at the Boston Celtics. On February 23, 2011, Budinger scored a new career-high 30 points in a 124–119 win over the Cleveland Cavaliers. During the Rockets' season finale against the Minnesota Timberwolves, Budinger scored a new career-high 35 points on 12 of 21 shooting, including 4 for 8 from 3-point range.

During the 2011 NBA lockout, Budinger agreed to play for the Russian team PBC Lokomotiv-Kuban; however, before he signed the deal, the lockout ended and the agreement fell through.

In 2012, Budinger competed in the 2012 Slam Dunk Contest, where he performed a dunk over P. Diddy, a wheelhouse slam, and a blindfolded reverse dunk honoring former Slam Dunk Contest winner Cedric Ceballos. However, he ultimately lost to Jeremy Evans by one percent of the votes.

Minnesota Timberwolves (2012–2015)
On June 25, 2012, Budinger, along with the rights to Lior Eliyahu, was traded to the Minnesota Timberwolves for the eighteenth pick in the 2012 NBA draft. On November 2, he made his debut for the Timberwolves in a 92–80 win over the Sacramento Kings, recording nine points, five rebounds and one block in 21 minutes off the bench.

Indiana Pacers (2015–2016)
On July 12, 2015, Budinger was traded to the Indiana Pacers in exchange for Damjan Rudež. On October 28, he made his debut for Indiana in a 106–99 loss to the Toronto Raptors, recording two rebounds and one assist in 15 minutes off the bench. On March 5, 2016, he was waived by the Pacers.

Phoenix Suns (2016)
On March 8, 2016, Budinger signed with the Phoenix Suns. He made his debut for the Suns the following night, recording two points, two rebounds and one assist in a loss to the New York Knicks.

On September 26, 2016, Budinger signed with the Brooklyn Nets, but was waived on October 18 after appearing in four preseason games.

Baskonia (2016–2017)
On October 27, 2016, Budinger signed with Baskonia.

Volleyball career
In 2017, Budinger decided to retire from basketball to focus on playing professional beach volleyball. He made his debut on the AVP tour with Sean Rosenthal in 2018, and in 2019 is partnering with Casey Patterson.

Personal life
Budinger's parents are Duncan and Māra Budinger. His maternal grandfather, Andrejs Eglītis, was Latvian, and moved to the United States shortly after World War II. Andrejs was proud of his descent and wrote a book about it called A Man From Latvia. Budinger's older sister, Brittanie, played volleyball at the University of San Francisco and as a professional in Europe. His older brother, Duncan, also plays volleyball and tours professionally.

NBA career statistics

Regular season

|-
| align="left" | 
| align="left" | Houston
| 74 || 4 || 20.1 || .441 || .369 || .770 || 3.0 || 1.2 || .5 || .2 || 8.9
|-
| align="left" | 
| align="left" | Houston
| 78 || 22 || 22.3 || .425 || .325 || .855 || 3.6 || 1.6 || .5 || .2 || 9.8
|-
| align="left" | 
| align="left" | Houston
| 58 || 9 || 22.4 || .442 || .402 || .771 || 3.7 || 1.3 || .5 || .1 || 9.6
|-
| align="left" | 
| align="left" | Minnesota
| 23 || 1 || 22.1 || .414 || .321 || .762 || 3.1 || 1.1 || .6 || .3 || 9.4
|-
| align="left" | 
| align="left" | Minnesota
| 41 || 8 || 18.3 || .394 || .350 || .821 || 2.5 || .8 || .5 || .0 || 6.7
|-
| align="left" | 
| align="left" | Minnesota
| 67 || 4 || 19.2 || .433 || .364 || .827 || 3.0 || 1.0 || .7 || .1 || 6.8
|-
| align="left" | 
| align="left" | Indiana
| 49 || 2 || 14.9 || .418 || .290 || .708 || 2.5 || 1.0 || .6 || .2 || 4.4
|-
| align="left" | 
| align="left" | Phoenix
| 17 || 0 || 11.8 || .511 || .235 || .625 || 1.7 || .9 || .2 || .1 || 3.2
|- class="sortbottom"
| align="center" colspan="2"| Career
| 407 || 50 || 19.7 || .430 || .352 || .797 || 3.0 || 1.2 || .5 || .2 || 7.9

EuroLeague

|-
| style="text-align:left;"| 2016–17
| style="text-align:left;" rowspan=1| Baskonia
| 29 || 16 || 18.5 || .584 || .328 || .852 || 3.8 || 1.2 || .6 || .1 || 6.8 || 7.8
|- class="sortbottom"
| align="center" colspan="2"| Career
| 29 || 16 || 18.5 || .584 || .328 || .852 || 3.8 || 1.2 || .6 || .1 || 6.8 || 7.8

Awards
 2006 Mizuno National Player of the Year in high school boys' volleyball
Co-MVP of the 2006 McDonald's High School All-American Game (with Kevin Durant)
2006 First-team Parade All-American
Named the Most Valuable Player of the Nike Junior World Championships in Douai, France
Named the Most Valuable Player of the 2006 US Junior Olympic Volleyball Tournament in the 18 and under division.
2006 California Mr. Basketball
2006 McDonald's All-American Slam Dunk Contest Runner-Up
Named the 2007 Pac-10 Freshman of the Year

See also
 2006 high school boys basketball All-Americans

References

External links
 
 Chase Budinger at euroleague.net
 Chase Budinger at acb.com 
 
 Chase Budinger at arizonawildcats.com
 
 
 

1988 births
Living people
American expatriate basketball people in Spain
American men's basketball players
American men's beach volleyball players
American people of Latvian descent
Arizona Wildcats men's basketball players
Basketball players from California
Detroit Pistons draft picks
Houston Rockets players
Indiana Pacers players
Liga ACB players
McDonald's High School All-Americans
Minnesota Timberwolves players
Parade High School All-Americans (boys' basketball)
People from Encinitas, California
Phoenix Suns players
Saski Baskonia players
Small forwards
Sportspeople from Carlsbad, California